D.J. International Records is a Chicago record label founded in 1985 that specializes in house music, a type of electronic dance music. In the 1980s, DJ International Records released music by key house innovators such as Frankie Knuckles, Ron Hardy (his 1986 remix of the It’s track “Donnie”), Hot Mix 5 member Farley "Jackmaster" Funk (his 1986 track "Love Can't Turn Around"), Steve “Silk” Hurley (his 1985 "Music Is The Key"), and Marshall Jefferson (his 1986 song "Move Your Body"). DJ International Records also released ESP’s song "It's You", Dymond's "Wild About Your Love", and Liz Torres' "What You Make Me Feel". The label also released acid house, such as Adonis's 1987 "The Poke" and Tyree's "Acid Over", as well as late 1980s hip house recordings, such as Fast Eddie's "Hip House" and "Yo Yo Get Funky". In the early 1990s, the label released Mike Dunn's song "Jass Yo Azz Off". Udiscover Music called the "history of DJ International...the history of house music, the very DNA of modern dance music."

In 2019, the label’s master recordings that were not acquired by other entities were bought by Universal Music.

In August 2020, DJ International debuted a Frankie Knuckles track "Carefree (I Am A Star)" posthumously as the first release from the forthcoming Jackmaster 7 album, a follow-up to the six Jackmaster albums the label put out between 1987 and 1991.

References

American record labels
House music record labels
Universal Music Group
Record labels established in 1985
1985 establishments in Illinois